Thrypsigenes colluta is a moth in the family Gelechiidae. It was described by Edward Meyrick in 1914. It is found in Guyana.

The wingspan is 10–13 mm. The forewings are whitish ochreous, faintly speckled with greyish. The hindwings are ochreous whitish or grey whitish.

References

Gelechiinae
Moths described in 1914